Dapo-Iboké is a town in south-western Ivory Coast, near the border of Liberia. It is a sub-prefecture of Tabou Department in San-Pédro Region, Bas-Sassandra District.

Dapo-Iboké was a commune until March 2012, when it became one of 1126 communes nationwide that were abolished.

In 2014, the population of the sub-prefecture of Dapo-Iboké was 14,858.

Villages
The fifteen villages of the sub-prefecture of Dapo-Iboké and their population in 2014 are:

References

Sub-prefectures of San-Pédro Region
Former communes of Ivory Coast